Sheffield was a European Parliament constituency covering the City of Sheffield and parts of Derbyshire in England.

Prior to its uniform adoption of proportional representation in 1999, the United Kingdom used first-past-the-post for the European elections in England, Scotland and Wales. The European Parliament constituencies used under that system were smaller than the later regional constituencies and only had one Member of the European Parliament each.

When the constituency was created in 1979, it consisted of the Westminster Parliament constituencies of Chesterfield, Derbyshire North East, Sheffield Attercliffe, Sheffield Brightside, Sheffield Hallam, Sheffield Heeley, Sheffield Hillsborough and Sheffield Park.  In 1984, Park was replaced by Sheffield Central, and the boundaries of the other constituencies changed.  Larger changes occurred in 1994, when the Derbyshire constituencies were removed to Nottinghamshire North and Chesterfield and replaced by Barnsley West and Penistone.

Members of the European Parliament

Results

References

External links
 David Boothroyd's United Kingdom Election Results

1979 establishments in England
1999 disestablishments in England
Constituencies established in 1979
Constituencies disestablished in 1999
European Parliament constituencies in England (1979–1999)
Politics of Sheffield